Alcona is a ghost town in Alcona Township, Rooks County, Kansas, United States.

History
Alcona was issued a post office in 1878. The post office was discontinued in 1930.  There is nothing left of Alcona.

References

Former populated places in Rooks County, Kansas
Former populated places in Kansas
1878 establishments in Kansas
Populated places established in 1878